A Voice in the Wind (1993) is a novel by Francine Rivers, and the first book in the Mark of the Lion Series.

Synopsis 
It is the story of a young Christian-Jewish slave named Hadassah living under the Roman Empire.  When Hadassah is captured by Roman soldiers, her entire family is killed.  She serves as a slave to a teenaged Roman woman named Julia, whose parents marry her off to a much older man. Although Julia initially dislikes Hadassah because of her plain appearance, she comes to trust her.  Hadassah is faithful and kind but afraid of many things.  As the story progresses, she gains the courage to tell others about her faith and the God that she serves. Meanwhile, she struggles with her love for Julia's older brother, Marcus, thinking it's a trick from Satan to lead her away from God. All he wants is for her to love him the same as he loves her, but she struggles with a choice, remain close to God or fall for a man who will lead her on a dark road away from him. As she struggles to remain close to God, her hard life and  difficult challenges are just beginning to the extent she is thrown to the lions.

The story goes into many different side characters, such as the young gladiator Atretes, who—as well as the main characters—are all searching for peace and purpose but unable to find it in the world of pleasures Rome has to offer. Throughout the entire novel, Hadassah's Christian faith (kept a secret for fear of death) is continually challenged and evolved, helping her overcome the harsher aspects as life as a slave in the Roman Empire.

References 

1993 American novels
Mark of the Lion Series